Huang Qiang may refer to:
 Huang Qiang (politician) (born 1963), Chinese politician
 Huang Qiang (diver) (born 1982), Chinese diver

See also
 Huang Qian (born 1986), Chinese chess player